Brynild Gruppen AS is one of the larger Norwegian family-owned and operated confectionery companies. Its products include chocolate, confections, hard candy, sweets, nuts and dried fruits.

History 
The company's history dates from 1895 and is based in Fredrikstad, close to Oslo in Southern Norway. It now markets a number of brands including Dent (mints and gum), Minde Sjokolade (chocolates), Michael's Farm (nuts), Brynild (confections), and Den Lille Nøttefabrikken (snacks and nuts).

Selected products 
 Minde Sjokolade Risbrød (chocolate in a 400 gram bag)
 DLN Spesial med havsalt (salted nuts)
 Dent Oi (soft mints)
 Brynild (assorted candy in a bag)

References

External links 
  

Food and drink companies of Norway
Brand name confectionery
Food and drink companies established in 1895
1895 establishments in Norway
Norwegian brands